Nordenskiöld Bay or Nordenskiöld Fjord is a fjord on the Barents Sea coast of Severny Island in Novaya Zemlya, Russia. The fjord is named after Arctic explorer Adolf Erik Nordenskiöld.

Geography
The fjord opens to the northwest in the western coast of the island between Cape Maslennikov in the west and Cape Cherny in the north. Three glaciers converge at the head of the fjord, discharging from the Severny Island ice cap and covering the inner fjord with ice. Mount Kruzenshtern is located near the fjord.

See also
List of fjords of Russia

References

Novaya Zemlya
Fjords of Russia